The Battle of Podujevo (Bitka kod Podujeva) was fought in the Kosovo War between the Yugoslav Special Anti-Terrorist Unit and KLA insurgents in the village of Llapashtica e Epërme in the municipality of Podujevo. These events started after the death of a policeman who was killed by KLA militants in the area.

Battle
The battle occurred between 23–27 December 1998. According to international monitors who contributed to Operation Eagle Eye, this battle shattered a ceasefire called on by foreign forces. At the conclusion of the fighting, the Kosovo Diplomatic Observer Mission monitored a convoy of Yugoslav Army vehicles.

References 

Podujevo
Podujevo
1998 in Kosovo
Podujevo
Podujevo
Kosovo Liberation Army
December 1998 events in Europe